Mazin Masoud Darwish Al-Kasbi (born 27 April 1993), commonly known as Mazin Al-Kasbi, is an Omani footballer who plays as a goalkeeper for Fanja SC.

Club career
On 28 July 2013, he signed a contract with 2012–13 Oman Elite League runners-up Fanja SC. On 6 August 2014, he signed a one-year contract extension with Fanja SC.

Club career statistics

International career
National Team

Mazin is part of the first team squad of the Oman national football team. He was selected for the national team for the first time in 2012. He made his first appearance for Oman on 8 November 2012 in a friendly match against Estonia. He has made appearances in the 2012 WAFF Championship, the 2014 FIFA World Cup qualification, the 2013 Gulf Cup of Nations, the 2014 WAFF Championship, the 2015 AFC Asian Cup qualification and the 2014 Gulf Cup of Nations.

Honours

Club
With Fanja
Oman Professional League (0): Runner-up 2013-14
Sultan Qaboos Cup (1): 2013-14
Oman Professional League Cup (1): 2014-15
Oman Super Cup (0): Runner-up 2013, 2014

References

External links
 
 
 Mazin Al-Kasbi at Goal.com
 
 
 
 Mazin Al-Kasbi - ASIAN CUP Australia 2015

1993 births
Living people
Omani footballers
Oman international footballers
Association football goalkeepers
2015 AFC Asian Cup players
Al-Seeb Club players
Fanja SC players
Oman Professional League players
Footballers at the 2014 Asian Games
Asian Games competitors for Oman
People from Muscat, Oman